Richie Wilcox (born 1980) is a Canadian theatre director, singer and performer who - alongside his husband and collaborator Aaron Collier - currently helms Heist, a live art company committed to creating, producing and presenting innovative, genre-bending and queerly playful performances. Wilcox is also the current Artistic Producer at the Ship's Company Theatre.

Wilcox was a contestant on the first season of reality television show Canadian Idol.

Early life 
Born in New Waterford, Nova Scotia, Wilcox's first national performance came on a Rita MacNeil Christmas television special when he was nine years old.

Education 
Wilcox subsequently studied drama at University College of Cape Breton (now Cape Breton University) and Dalhousie University, graduating with honours from the Theatre Studies program at University of King's College. He completed his Masters in Theatre Direction at Texas State University in San Marcos, Texas. He is pursuing a Ph.D. in theatre at York University in Toronto, where he taught Second Year Devised theatre.

Career 
In 2003, on the first season of Canadian Idol, Richie Wilcox finished in a three-way tie for eighth place. He was eliminated after the first week of Top 11 performances, although fellow Halifax singer Gary Beals went on to finish in second place.

Before Idol, he was assistant manager of a deli. After Idol, from 2003 to 2005, Wilcox wrote a weekly column about reality shows for The Daily News.

Wilcox has performed in and directed numerous theatre productions in Halifax. He co-founded independent theatre company, Angels & Heroes. After four increasingly successful seasons with the indie troupe and two summers acting and directing in a company called Festival Antigonish, Wilcox went on to complete a Masters in Theatre Direction at Texas State University in San Marcos, Texas before returning to Halifax in 2007. He won a Merritt Award for Emerging Theatre Artist in 2007.

Personal life 
Wilcox is openly gay.

References

External links
 Richie Wilcox profile at GayHalifax.org

1980 births
Living people
Canadian Idol participants
Canadian male stage actors
Canadian people of British descent
Canadian LGBT singers
Musicians from Nova Scotia
Canadian gay actors
Canadian gay musicians
Gay singers
Cape Breton University alumni
People from New Waterford, Nova Scotia
University of King's College alumni
21st-century Canadian male singers
20th-century Canadian LGBT people
21st-century Canadian LGBT people